"A Night in Tunisia" is a musical composition written by American trumpeter Dizzy Gillespie around 1940–42. He wrote it while he was playing with the Benny Carter band. It has become a jazz standard. It is also known as "Interlude", and with lyrics by Raymond Leveen was recorded by Sarah Vaughan in 1944.

Background
Gillespie called the tune "Interlude" and said "some genius decided to call it 'Night in Tunisia'". He said the tune was composed at the piano at Kelly's Stables in New York. He gave Frank Paparelli co-writer credit in compensation for some unrelated transcription work, but Paparelli had nothing to do with the song. "A Night in Tunisia" was one of the signature pieces of Gillespie's bebop big band, and he also played it with his small groups. In January 2004, The Recording Academy added the 1946 Victor recording by Gillespie to the Grammy Hall of Fame.

On the album A Night at Birdland Vol. 1, Art Blakey introduced his 1954 cover version with this statement: "At this time we'd like to play a tune [that] was written by the famous Dizzy Gillespie. I feel rather close to this tune because I was right there when he composed it in Texas on the bottom of a garbage can." The audience laughs, but Blakey responds, "Seriously." The liner notes say, "The [Texas] sanitation department can take a low bow."

Analysis

The complex ostinato bass line in the "A section" is notable for avoiding the standard walking bass pattern of straight quarter notes, and the use of oscillating half-step-up/half-step-down chord changes (using the Sub V, a tritone substitute chord for the dominant chord) gives the song a unique, mysterious feeling. The B section is notable for having an unresolved minor II-V, since the chord progression of the B section is taken from the B section of the standard "Alone Together", causing the V chord to lead back into the Sub V of the A section.

Like many of Gillespie's tunes, it features a short written introduction and a brief interlude that occurs between solo sections — in this case, a twelve-bar sequence leading into a four-bar break for the next soloist.

Notable recordings

Early recordings 1944-46 
A live recording of "A Night in Tunisia" was made in January 1944 of the Gillespie-Pettiford Quintet at the Onyx Club in New York City. 
Sarah Vaughan, backed by Gillespie, recorded a vocal version of "Interlude" on 31 December 1944, which was issued on the Continental label in 1946. 
In January 1945 Gillespie and Pettiford made a studio recording of "Interlude (Night in Tunisia)" as part of 'Boyd Raeburn and His Orchestra'.
A live recording of Gillespie and Charlie Parker performing "A Night in Tunisia" was made at the NYC Town Hall on 22 June 1945,
 Gillespie’s studio recording of 22 February 1946, for RCA Victor, was inducted to the Grammy Hall of Fame in 2004. The personnel included Don Byas, Milt Jackson, and Ray Brown.
 Parker’s recording of 28 March 1946, for Dial Records, includes Miles Davis. "Ornithology" was on the B-side. This session included the so-called "famous alto break" that became synonymous with Parker.

Cover versions 
 Art Blakey with Lee Morgan, A Night in Tunisia (1960)
 Clifford Brown, The Beginning and the End (1955)
 Dexter Gordon with Bud Powell, Our Man in Paris (1963)
 Donald Harrison, Real Life Stories (2001)
 Fats Navarro (1950)
 Charlie Parker and Dizzy Gillespie, Jazz at Massey Hall (1953)
 Bud Powell (1951)
 Boyd Raeburn with Dizzy Gillespie, 1945
 Sonny Rollins, A Night at the Village Vanguard (1957)
 Sarah Vaughan, 1944
 Mary Lou Williams, Live at the Keystone Korner (1977)
 McCoy Tyner, Today and Tomorrow (1964)

References

1942 songs
Compositions by Dizzy Gillespie
Bebop jazz standards
1940s jazz standards
Jazz compositions in D minor
Songs with lyrics by Raymond Leveen